The Association of Combatant Clerics is an Iranian reformist clerical political party. It is regarded as a left-wing party within the Iranian political spectrum.

History

The Association of Combatant Clerics was founded in 1987 after abolition of the Islamic Republic Party, the last political party of that time. The association was originally radical, populist, rather than reformist in orientation, and favored a focus "on exporting the revolution and calling for the state's monopoly over the economy," rather than democracy and freedom of expression.  As of 2007, it advocated limits on clerical power in Iranian politics and extending individual freedoms—though not to the extent that might "lead to secularism or liberalism."

After the resignation of Mehdi Karroubi from the post of secretary general, the party had no secretary general until late August 2005, when Mohammad Mousavi Khoeiniha was elected as the new secretary general. Former President of Iran Mohammad Khatami is the Chairman of the association's Central Council.

Members 
According to Muhammad Sahimi, the party "has a significant number of followers and sympathizers among the younger clerics".

Central council members 
28 members of the party's central council are:

 Mohammad Mousavi Khoeiniha (Secretary-General)
 Majid Ansari (Speaker)
 Mohammad Khatami (Head of Council)
 Mohammad Hashemi
 Hadi Khamenei
 Ali Ajam
 Mohammad-Ali Abtahi
 Mohammad-Ali Ansari
 Mohammad Mousavi-Bojnourdi

 Issa Velayi
 Mohammad Razavi
 Seyyed Mohammad Hashemi
 Ali-Akbar Ashtiani
 Mohammad-Ali Khosravi
 Taqi Daricheyi
 Serajeddin Mousavi
 Ali Mohammad Dastgheib Shirazi
 Fazel Ferdosi

 Ali-Asghar Rahmani Khalili
 Assadollah Kian-Ersi
 Mohammad Moghaddam
 Mojtaba Nourmofidi
 Mohammad-Ali Nezamzadeh
 Mehdi Emam-Jamarani
 Abdolvahed Mousavi-Lari
 Mohammad-Ali Sadoughi
 Asadollah Bayat-Zanjani

Other members 
Mehdi Karroubi (former member)
Sadegh Khalkhali (deceased)
 Ali Akbar Mohtashamipur (deceased)
Hadi Ghaffari
Rasoul Montajabnia
Abdollah Nouri
Mohammad-Reza Tavassoli (deceased)
Hassan Sane'i
Mahmoud Doayi
Ghodratollah Alikhani
Mohammad-Ali Rahmani

See also
Political parties in Iran
Clericalism in Iran

Notes

References

External links
Mr Khatami, the Chairman of the Central Council of Militant Clerics Society, from Mohammad Ali Abtahi's weblog (in Persian)
Mousavi Khoiniha became the secretary general of the Militant Clerics Society, from BBC Persian
First meeting notes of Militant Clerics Society, from Mohammad Ali Abtahi's Persian weblog

1988 establishments in Iran
Reformist political groups in Iran
Political parties established in 1988
Iranian clerical political groups